Huddersfield Town's 1953–54 campaign is Town's best ever finish in a season since World War II. Following the previous season's promotion onslaught, Town and especially Jimmy Glazzard made sure that the previous season's achievements weren't forgotten in a hurry. They finished in 3rd place in Division 1 with 51 points, just 6 points behind the champions Wolverhampton Wanderers. The goalscoring feats of Jimmy Glazzard, who scored 29 goals and the assistance of Vic Metcalfe, who himself scored 11 goals helped Town finish in their highest post-war finish to date.

Squad at the start of the season

Review
Andy Beattie's team were on an all-time high following their immediate return to Division 1 after just one season in Division 2. The start of the season continued where the previous season left off and after 4 games, Town were top of the table with 3 wins, including a 5-1 win over Portsmouth, where Jimmy Glazzard got the first of his 3 hat-tricks that he would achieve during the season. His other 2 came in the space of 3 matches against Sheffield United and Aston Villa.

The team's performances kept them up in the upper realms of the division, with the chance of winning the title, not being too unrealistic. The season ground to a halt near the end, when Vic Metcalfe was forced to miss the last 7 games of the season and many say this was the reason that Town failed to win the title for the first time in 28 years. They did however finish 3rd, just 6 points behind Wolverhampton Wanderers, who Town actually beat in their penultimate game of the season.

Squad at the end of the season

Results

Division One

FA Cup

Appearances and goals

1953-54
English football clubs 1953–54 season